Pierre Breteche (2 July 1928–1 July 2020) was a French sailor who competed in the 1968 Summer Olympics. He was born in Nantes and died there in 2020.

References

External links

1928 births
2020 deaths
Sportspeople from Nantes
French male sailors (sport)
Olympic sailors of France
Sailors at the 1968 Summer Olympics – 5.5 Metre
20th-century French people